Astathes laosensis is a species of beetle in the family Cerambycidae. It was described by Pic in 1939. It is known from Laos.

References

L
Beetles described in 1939
Beetles of Asia